or  is a lake in the municipality of Namsskogan in Trøndelag county, Norway. It is near Børgefjell National Park.

See also
List of lakes in Norway

References

Lakes of Trøndelag
Namsskogan